is a Japanese politician who served in the House of Representatives in the Diet (national legislature) as a member of the Liberal Democratic Party.

He was born in Tokyo Prefecture as Yuji Shima and adopted his mother's family name at age 3, becoming Yuji Ueno. He attended the University of Tokyo and passed the bar exam while still in college. In 1953, he joined the Ministry of Finance. During this time he attended Syracuse University in the United States as a part of the Fulbright Program.

He worked in the Japanese Embassy in Paris from 1963 to 1967. While stationed in Paris, he adopted the Tsushima family name upon his marriage to Sonoko Tsushima, the daughter of writer Osamu Dazai (Shuji Tsushima) and niece of politician Bunji Tsushima.

Leaving the ministry in 1974, he was elected to the House of Representatives in 1976, representing Aomori Prefecture. He served as the Minister of Health in 1990 and 2000.

He was elected to head the LDP faction of former Prime Minister Ryutaro Hashimoto in 2005 following Hashimoto's resignation amid a 100 million yen political funds scandal.

On July 19, 2009, after 33 consecutive years in office, Tsushima announced that he had no plan to run in the following election. His seat was taken over by opposition candidate Hokuto Yokoyama in the 2009 general election.

He registered as an attorney in 2005 (while still in office), joining the Tokyo law firm of Tanabe & Partners, and remained a partner at the firm following his resignation. In March 2010 he was appointed as a special advisor to Shinsei Bank.

Family 
Tsushima was the fourth of five Diet members in his family. His son Jun Tsushima is currently a member of the House of Representatives, having won the Aomori 1st district seat previously held by his father in the 2012 general election. Tsushima attributed his family's influence to a decision by Bunji Tsushima to give his land in Aomori to farm laborers. The other family members in the Diet were Bunji Tsushima, who served in both houses following a stint as Governor of Aomori Prefecture; Kichirō Tazawa, a member of the House of Representatives from 1960 to 1996 and defense minister in the cabinet of Zenko Suzuki; and Kyoichi Tsushima, a member of the House of Representatives since 2003 who served as a vice-minister in the cabinet of Yoshihiko Noda.

References 

Government ministers of Japan
Members of the House of Representatives (Japan)
University of Tokyo alumni
Living people
1930 births
Liberal Democratic Party (Japan) politicians
21st-century Japanese politicians